The 2021–22 3. Liga is the 29th season of the third-tier football league of Slovakia since its establishment in 1993. The league is composed of 66 teams divided into three groups of 16 teams and one group (Západ) composed of 18 teams. Teams are divided into four divisions: 3. liga Bratislava, 3. liga Západ (West), 3. liga Stred (Central), 3. liga Východ (Eastern), according to geographical separation.

League tables

Bratislava

Západ (West)

Stred (Central)

Východ (Eastern)

Changes
The following teams have changed division since the 2020–21 season:

To 2. liga
Relegated from 2. liga
 Poprad

Promoted from 4. liga
 Raslavice
 Rudňany

From 2. liga
Promoted to 2. liga
 Humenné

Relegated to 4. liga
 Bardejovská Nová Ves

Relegated to 5. liga
 Plavnica (due to financial problems)

League table

See also
 2021–22 Slovak First Football League
 2021–22 2. Liga (Slovakia)
 2021–22 Slovak Cup

References

3. Liga (Slovakia) seasons
3
Slovak Third League